was a Japanese boxer. He competed in the men's welterweight event at the 1932 Summer Olympics. In his first fight of the tournament, he lost to Erich Campe of Germany.

References

External links

1909 births
Year of death missing
Japanese male boxers
Olympic boxers of Japan
Boxers at the 1932 Summer Olympics
Place of birth missing
Welterweight boxers